A moot hall is a meeting or assembly building, traditionally to decide local issues.

In Anglo-Saxon England, a low ring-shaped earthwork served as a moot hill or moot mound, where the elders of the hundred would meet to take decisions. Some of these acquired permanent buildings, known as moot halls.  However, many moot halls are on relatively new sites within later settlements.

There are moot halls in:
 Aldeburgh
 Appleby-in-Westmorland
 Brampton
 Colchester
 Daventry
 Elstow
 Hexham
 Holton le Moor
 Keswick
 Newcastle upon Tyne
 Steeple Bumpstead
 Maldon
 Mansfield
 Monnington on Wye
 Wirksworth

See also
Kgotla
Mead hall
Meeting house
Thing (assembly)
Witenagemot

References

External links

Moot Hall Elstow, Bedford
Secklow Hundred, Milton Keynes
Six Hills Moot, Leicestershire

Anglo-Saxon architecture
Buildings and structures in England
Seats of local government in Europe
Government buildings in England